Alfredo Alves Tinoco (2 December 1904 - 4 July 1975), known as just Tinoco, is a former Brazilian football player. He has played for Brazil national team.

References

1904 births
1975 deaths
Footballers from Rio de Janeiro (city)
Brazilian footballers
Brazil international footballers
1934 FIFA World Cup players
CR Vasco da Gama players
Association football midfielders